Skala is a town and a former municipality in Laconia, Peloponnese, Greece. Since the 2011 local government reform it is part of the municipality Evrotas, of which it is the seat and a municipal unit. The municipal unit has an area of 143.945 km2. Population 5,933 (2011). Skala is known for organic food production and the organic wholesaler Stavros Darmos with his company Silver Leaf.

History
Following the Orlov events, in 1777, many inhabitants of Skala bearing the name "Mavroudas" migrated to Koldere, near Magnesia (ad Sipylum).

Notable people
Tracy Spiridakos, actress

References

Populated places in Laconia